The Habitation Module was a particular habitation module for the International Space Station was intended to be the Station's main living quarters designed with galley, toilet, shower, sleep stations and medical facilities. About the size of a bus, the module was canceled after its pressurized hull was complete. If named and sent into space, the Habitation Module would have been berthed to Tranquility.

History
In order to accommodate more than three people on the ISS, a lifeboat craft other than a single Soyuz TMA would be needed and such a Crew Return Vehicle was not there at that time. Later in the project, budget constraints and delays to the space station due to the Space Shuttle Columbia disaster led to its cancellation. On 14 February 2006 it was decided to recycle the Habitation Module for ground-based Life Support Research for future missions.

With the cancellation of the Habitation Module, sleeping places are now spread throughout the station. There are two in the Russian segment and four in the US segment. However, just like a hotel, it is not necessary to have a separate 'bunk' in space at all; many visitors just strap their sleeping bag to the wall of a module, get into it, and sleep.

At various points in the design of the International Space Station, an inflatable TransHab module with several times the space of the initial design was considered as an alternative to the Habitation module. This concept is similar to the Bigelow Expandable Activity Module, which was brought to the ISS in May 2016 by a Dragon cargo spacecraft to test the concept. Some engineers in Britain have also proposed a Habitation Extension Module which could be attached to Node 3.

See also
 Habitation Extension Module - proposed ISS module
 Zvezda - base crew module of the ISS

References

External links
  International Space Station

Components of the International Space Station
Cancelled spacecraft